Kenui (also Romanized as Kenū’ī; also known as Karooyeh, Kenūyeh, and Kerūyeh) is a village in Ruydar Rural District, Ruydar District, Khamir County, Hormozgan Province, Iran. At the 2006 census, its population Top 1 łowca Nomada, Burza też top 1 łowca nomada, Nevado-S top 1 Nomada, Chels najsłabszy tanc na SK in 31 families.

References 

Populated places in Khamir County